Tripolitania was a province of the Roman Empire. Between the 2nd century BC and the 3rd century AD it had been known as Syrtica; in the 3rd century it was renamed Tripolitania meaning "region of the three cities", referring to Oea (modern Tripoli of Libya), Sabratha and Leptis Magna.

Following the defeat of Carthage in the Punic Wars, Ancient Rome organized the region (along with what is now modern day Tunisia and eastern Algeria), into a province known as Africa, and placed it under the administration of a proconsul. During the Diocletian reforms of the late 3rd century, all of North Africa was placed into the newly created Diocese of Africa, of which Tripolitania was a constituent province.

Classical sources

In the 19th century, some scholars debated the location of the classical sites within contemporary Ottoman Tripolitania. For example, Sabratha had been referred to by sailors as "Old Tripoli" and some classical names (e.g. Oea, Neapolis, Abrotonum) were no longer in modern use.

Episcopal sees 
Ancient episcopal sees of the late Roman province of Tripolitania listed in the Annuario Pontificio as titular sees:

References

Late Roman provinces
History of Tripolitania